Thomas Herbert Houghton was an English-born rugby league footballer who represented New Zealand in 1909.

Personal life
Houghton was born in England and was one of two sons of Joseph Houghton. Joseph served as the chairman of the Northern Union before migrating to Auckland with Thomas and helping set up the Auckland Rugby League. Houghton's brother, Samuel, later served as the secretary of the ARL.

Playing career
Houghton was signed by St. Helens from Liverpool City in 1907, however he never played a first team match for the club.

Houghton then moved to New Zealand and played for Auckland in their third ever match on 17 September 1908 against Taranaki.

He was then part of the City combination that played against the North Shore on 24 July 1909 in the Auckland Rugby League's first ever sanctioned match. He again played for Auckland that year and toured Australia with New Zealand. On 3 July he played for New Zealand in the third Test against Australia.

Houghton joined the new Newton Rangers club and played for them in the inaugural Auckland Rugby League competition in 1910.

Later years
Houghton served as an official at the North Sydney Bears club in the NSWRL Premiership.

References

External links
Saints Heritage Society profile

Living people
New Zealand rugby league players
New Zealand national rugby league team players
Auckland rugby league team players
St Helens R.F.C. players
Newton Rangers players
Rugby league centres
Rugby league halfbacks
Liverpool City (rugby league) players
Rugby league fullbacks
North Sydney Bears
New Zealand rugby league administrators
Year of birth missing (living people)